Tmesisternus demissus is a species of beetle in the family Cerambycidae. It was described by Stephan von Breuning in 1939. It is known from Papua New Guinea.

References

demissus
Beetles described in 1939